Richard Alfred Hunter FRCP (11 November 1923 – 25 November 1981) was a British physician of German origin, and president of the History of Medicine Society of the Royal Society of Medicine from 1972 to 1973.
He was a psychiatrist, historian and book collector.  With his mother, Dr Ida Macalpine, also a psychiatrist, he wrote Three Hundred Years of Psychiatry 1535 to 1860, Oxford University Press, 1963, using title pages from books in his collection to illustrate this first full chronicle of British psychiatry.  Each book is accompanied by an essay describing its place in medical and social history.  It remains a unique and important source for the history and bibliography of psychiatry in Britain before 1860.

References 

Presidents of the History of Medicine Society
Fellows of the Royal College of Physicians
British psychiatrists
1923 births
1981 deaths
Physicians from Nuremberg
German emigrants to the United Kingdom